Sandy Layman is an American politician who served as a member of the Minnesota House of Representatives from 2017 to 2021. A member of the Republican Party of Minnesota, she represeneds District 5B in northern Minnesota.

Early life, education, and career 
Layman graduated from Brooklyn Center High School. She earned a Bachelor of Arts degree in organizational management and communications from Concordia University and a Master of Business Administration in executive management University of St. Thomas.

Career 
Layman was the president of the Grand Rapids Area Chamber of Commerce from 1987 to 1997, president of the Itasca Development Corporation from 1997 to 2003, commissioner of the Iron Range Resources Board for Governor Tim Pawlenty from 2003 to 2011, and an adjunct professor at the College of St. Scholastica from 2011 to 2016. She is on the boards of the Entrepreneur Fund, Itasca Community Television, and the editorial committee of the Rural Minnesota Journal. She is a consultant at her firm, Layman Consulting.

Minnesota House of Representatives 
Layman was elected to the Minnesota House of Representatives in 2016, defeating Minnesota Democratic–Farmer–Labor Party (DFL) incumbent Tom Anzelc.

Personal life 
Layman and her husband, Bill, have two children. They reside in Cohasset, where they are members of Our Redeemer Lutheran Church.

References

External links 

 Official House of Representatives website
 Official campaign website

Living people
Republican Party members of the Minnesota House of Representatives
21st-century American politicians
21st-century American women politicians
Women state legislators in Minnesota
University of St. Thomas (Minnesota) alumni
Concordia University (Saint Paul, Minnesota) alumni
People from Itasca County, Minnesota
1950 births